The Extraordinary and Plenipotentiary Ambassador of Peru to the United Kingdom of Great Britain and Northern Ireland is the official representative of the Republic of Peru to the United Kingdom.

The ambassador acts concurrently as the Peruvian representative to the International Maritime Organization and the International Whaling Commission, both also based in England.

Relations between both countries began almost immediately after Peruvian independence. The United Kingdom already had contributed to the South American efforts on the Patriot side and a diplomatic mission to the United Kingdom was ordered by José de San Martín in 1822, with the first British representative to Peru, Thomas Rowcroft, arriving to Callao aboard the HMS Cambridge the following year.

In the 1830s, over 50% of all imports to Peru came from the United Kingdom. Prominent British companies in Peru at the time included the Compañía Peruana de Ferrocarriles, the Pacific Steam Navigation Company and Antony Gibbs & Sons. Between 1860 and 1950, some 1900 Brits had established themselves in Peru.

List of representatives

See also
List of ambassadors of Peru to Ireland

References

United Kingdom
Peru